The 2008 Seattle Seahawks season was the franchise's 33rd season in the National Football League (NFL), the seventh season in Qwest Field, and the tenth and final under head coach Mike Holmgren. The Seahawks' streak of four consecutive NFC West divisional championships was broken, as they fell to a 4–12 record and missed the playoffs for the first time since 2002.

2008 NFL Draft

Final roster

     Starters in bold.
 (*) Denotes players that were selected for the 2009 Pro Bowl.

Notable roster additions
G Mike Wahle- Signed as a free agent from the Carolina Panthers
RB Julius Jones- Signed as a free agent from the Dallas Cowboys
RB TJ Duckett- Signed as a free agent from the Detroit Lions
K Olindo Mare- Signed as a free agent from the New Orleans Saints
DT Larry Tripplett- Signed as a free agent from the Buffalo Bills (released before the start of the regular season)
TE Jeb Putzier- Signed as a free agent from the Houston Texans (released during regular season)
P Reggie Hodges- Signed as a free agent (released before the start of the regular season)

Notable roster losses
K Josh Brown- Left as a free agent to sign with the St. Louis Rams
WR D.J. Hackett- Left as a free agent to sign with the Carolina Panthers
DT Chuck Darby- Left as a free agent to sign with the Detroit Lions
T Tom Ashworth- Released
RB Shaun Alexander- Released
G Chris Gray – Retired

Team captains 
 Matt Hasselbeck
 Walter Jones
 Deon Grant
 Lofa Tatupu
 Lance Laury
 D. D. Lewis

Schedule

Preseason

Regular season

Bold indicates division opponents.
Source: 2008 NFL season results

Standings

Game Summaries

Preseason

Week P1: at Minnesota Vikings

Week P2: vs. Chicago Bears

Week P3: at San Diego Chargers

Week P4: vs. Oakland Raiders

Regular season

Week 1: at Buffalo Bills

The Seahawks began their 2008 campaign on the road against the Buffalo Bills. In the first quarter, Seattle trailed early as Bills RB Marshawn Lynch got a 21-yard TD run. In the second quarter, the Seahawks continued to struggle as WR/PR Roscoe Parrish returned a punt 63 yards for a touchdown.  Seattle responded with QB Matt Hasselbeck completing a 20-yard TD pass to WR Nate Burleson. Buffalo closed out the half with kicker Rian Lindell getting a 35-yard and a 38-yard field goal.  In the third quarter, the Seahawks replied with kicker Olindo Mare nailing a 45-yard field goal.  However, the Bills pulled a trick play on Seattle. Appearing to go for a 32-yard field goal, Buffalo's holder (punter Brian Moorman) instead threw a 19-yard TD pass to DE Ryan Denney. The Bills pulled away with QB Trent Edwards completing a 30-yard TD pass to TE Robert Royal.

With the loss, the Seahawks began their season at 0–1.

Week 2: vs. San Francisco 49ers

Hoping to rebound from their road loss to the Bills, the Seahawks played their Week 2 home opener their NFC West foe, the San Francisco 49ers.  In the first quarter, the 'Hawks RB Julius Jones got a 27-yard TD run, along with DT Craig Terrill returning a fumble 10 yards for a touchdown.  The 49ers would reply with kicker Joe Nedney getting a 26-yard field goal.  In the second quarter, Nedney gave San Francisco a 28-yard field goal.  Seattle responded with kicker Olindo Mare getting a 51-yard field goal.  The 49ers would hack away at the lead as QB J. T. O'Sullivan completed a 3-yard TD pass to WR Bryant Johnson, yet the Seahawks closed out the half with Mare's 38-yard field goal.

In the third quarter, San Francisco took the lead with LB Patrick Willis returning an interception 86 yards for a touchdown, along with RB Frank Gore's 2-yard TD run.  Seattle regained the lead as RB T. J. Duckett made a 1-yard TD run, along with Mare kicking a 32-yard field goal.  However, the 49ers tied the game with Nedney's 28-yard field goal.  In overtime, San Francisco's Nedney nailed the game-winning 40-yard field goal.

With the loss, the Seahawks fell to 0–2.

Julius Jones (26 carries for 127 yards and a touchdown) got his first 100-yard game since Week 14 of 2006.

Week 3: vs. St. Louis Rams

The Seahawks stayed at home for a Week 3 NFC West duel with the St. Louis Rams.  In the first quarter, Seattle's kicker Olindo Mare made a 28-yard field goal.  The Seahawks continued their assault as QB Matt Hasselbeck completed a 10-yard TD pass to rookie WR Michael Bumpus and RB Julius Jones getting a 29-yard TD run.  In the second quarter, the Rams got on the board with former Seahawks kicker Olindo Mare getting a 43-yard field goal.  Seattle would reply with RB T. J. Duckett getting a 4-yard TD run.  St. Louis tried to rally as Brown kicked a 29-yard field goal, yet the Seahawks continued to increase their lead with Mare's 38-yard field goal.

In the third quarter, the Rams tried to come back as QB Marc Bulger completed a 21-yard TD pass to WR Dane Looker.  In the fourth quarter, Seattle flew away as Duckett got a 1-yard TD run and Mare nailed a 38-yard field goal.

With the win, the Seahawks entered their bye week at 1–2.

Week 5: at New York Giants

Coming off their bye week, the Seahawks flew to Giants Stadium for a Week 5 duel with the defending Super Bowl champions, the New York Giants.  In the first quarter, Seattle trailed early as QB Eli Manning completed a 32-yard TD pass to WR Domenik Hixon.  The Seahawks responded with kicker Olindo Mare completing a 30-yard field goal, yet New York answered with RB Brandon Jacobs getting a 3-yard TD run.  In the second quarter, the Giants increased their lead with kicker John Carney getting a 29-yard field goal, Jacobs getting a 1-yard TD run, and Carney making a 33-yard field goal.  Seattle closed out the half with Mare kicking a 29-yard field goal.

In the third quarter, New York pulled away as Manning completed a 23-yard TD pass to WR Sinorice Moss, along with Carney nailing a 35-yard field goal.  In the fourth quarter, the Giants sealed the win as QB David Carr completed a 5-yard TD pass to Moss.

With the loss, the Seahawks fell to 1–3.

Week 6: vs. Green Bay Packers

Hoping to rebound from their blowout road loss to the Giants, the Seahawks returned home for a Week 6 duel with the Green Bay Packers, as head coach Mike Holmgren faced his former team for the last time.  Also, QB Seneca Wallace was unable to play due to a knee injury he suffered from last week.  QB Charlie Frye was given the start.

In the first quarter, Seattle trailed early as Packers kicker Mason Crosby got a 29-yard field goal.  In the second quarter, the Seahawks took the lead as kicker Olindo Mare got a 50-yard field goal, while Frye completed a 6-yard TD pass to rookie TE John Carlson.  Green Bay tied the game as QB Aaron Rodgers got a 1-yard TD run.

In the third quarter, the Packers regained the lead as Rodgers completed a 45-yard TD pass to WR Greg Jennings.  In the fourth quarter, Green Bay pulled away as Rodgers completed a 1-yard TD pass to FB John Kuhn, along with Crosby nailing a 51-yard field goal.  Seattle tried to come back as Frye completed a 5-yard TD pass to WR Keary Colbert, but the Packers' defense was too much.

With the loss, the Seahawks fell to 1–4.

Week 7: at Tampa Bay Buccaneers

Hoping to snap a two-game losing streak, the Seahawks flew to Raymond James Stadium for a Week 7 Sunday night duel with their 1976 expansion rival, the Tampa Bay Buccaneers.  With QB Matt Hasselbeck recovering from an injured knee, back-up Seneca Wallace was given the start.

In the first quarter, Seattle trailed early as Buccaneers QB Jeff Garcia completed a 47-yard TD pass to TE Antonio Bryant.  In the second quarter, Tampa Bay increased their lead as RB Earnest Graham got a 1-yard TD run, along with kicker Matt Bryant getting a 27-yard field goal.  In the third quarter, the Seahawks got on the board as kicker Olindo Mare got a 26-yard field goal.  In the fourth quarter, the Buccaneers sailed away as Bryant nailed a 27-yard field goal.  Seattle ended the game's scoring as Wallace completed a 2-yard TD pass to rookie TE John Carlson.

With the loss, not only did the Seahawks fall to 1–5, but they also suffered their first-ever loss at Tampa Bay.

Week 8: at San Francisco 49ers

Trying to snap a three-game losing streak, the Seahawks flew to Bill Walsh Field at Candlestick Park for a Week 8 NFC West rematch with the San Francisco 49ers.  In the first quarter, the Seahawks took flight as kicker Olindo Mare got a 43-yard and a 42-yard field goal.  In the second quarter, Seattle increased its lead with RB T. J. Duckett getting a 1-yard TD run.  The 49ers responded with kicker Joe Nedney getting a 42-yard field goal.  The Seahawks closed out the half as CB Josh Wilson returned an interception 75 yards for a touchdown.

In the third quarter, San Francisco responded with Nedney making a 40-yard field goal, yet Seattle responded with QB Seneca Wallace completing a 43-yard TD pass to FB Leonard Weaver.  In the fourth quarter, the 49ers tried to rally as QB Shaun Hill completed a 2-yard TD pass to WR Jason Hill, yet the 'Hawks pulled away as Wallace hooked up with Weaver on a 62-yard TD pass.

With the win, the Seahawks improved to 2–5.

Week 9: vs. Philadelphia Eagles

Coming off their divisional road win over the 49ers, the Seahawks went home for a Week 9 duel with the Philadelphia Eagles.  In the first quarter, the 'Hawks immediately took flight as QB Seneca Wallace completed a franchise-long 90-yard TD pass to WR Koren Robinson.  In the second quarter, the Eagles took the lead as QB Donovan McNabb completed a 22-yard TD pass to WR Reggie Brown and a 1-yard TD pass to Todd Herremans.

In the third quarter, Philadelphia continued its domination as kicker David Akers got a 39-yard and a 24-yard field goal.  In the fourth quarter, the Eagles flew away as Akers nailed a 42-yard and a 39-yard field goal.

With the loss, the Seahawks fell to 2–6. As of 2020, this is their most recent loss to Philadelphia.

Week 10: at Miami Dolphins

The Seahawks flew to Dolphin Stadium for a Week 10 interconference duel with the Miami Dolphins.  In the first quarter, Seattle trailed early as Dolphins QB Chad Pennington completed a 39-yard TD pass to WR Ted Ginn Jr.  In the second quarter, the Seahawks continued to trail as Miami unleashed another play from the infamous "Wildcat Offense", with RB Ronnie Brown handing the ball off to RB Ricky Williams, who then took the ball 51 yards for a touchdown.  Seattle responded as DB Jordan Babineaux returned an interception 35 yards for a touchdown.

In the third quarter, the Seahawks drew closer as former Dolphins kicker Olindo Mare nailed a 37-yard and a 27-yard field goal.  In the fourth quarter, the Dolphins answered with Brown getting a 16-yard TD run.  Seattle tried to come back as QB Seneca Wallace completed a 3-yard TD pass to WR Koren Robinson.  However, Miami's defense prevented Wallace's 2-point conversion pass from working.

With the loss, the Seahawks fell to 2–7.

Week 11: vs. Arizona Cardinals

Trying to snap a two-game skid, the Seahawks went home for a Week 11 NFC West duel with the Arizona Cardinals.  For this game, QB Matt Hasselbeck finally recovered from his knee injury and was able to reclaim his starting role.

In the first quarter, Seattle trailed early as Cardinals kicker Neil Rackers made a 38-yard field goal, along with RB J. J. Arrington getting a 4-yard TD run.  In the second quarter, Arizona increased their lead as Rackers got a 48-yard field goal.  The Seahawks got on the board as Hasselbeck completed a 13-yard TD pass to RB Maurice Morris.  The Cardinals closed out the half with Rackers making a 54-yard field goal.

In the third quarter, Arizona increased its lead as Rackers nailed a 26-yard field goal, along with Warner completing a 6-yard TD pass to Arrington.  Seattle tried to rally as RB T. J. Duckett got a 1-yard (with a failed 2-point conversion) and a 2-yard TD run.  However, the Cardinals' defense prevented any possible comeback.

With the loss, the Seahawks fell to 2–8.

Week 12: vs. Washington Redskins

Trying to snap a three-game losing streak, the Seahawks stayed at home for a Week 12 duel with the Washington Redskins, headed by former Seahawk QB/Assistant Coach Jim Zorn.

In the first quarter, Seattle took flight as kicker Olindo Mare got a 45-yard field goal.  In the second quarter, the Redskins took the lead with RB Ladell Betts getting a 1-yard TD run.  The Seahawks got the lead again prior to halftime as QB Matt Hasselbeck completed a 4-yard TD pass to RB Maurice Morris.

In the third quarter, Washington retook the lead as kicker Shaun Suisham made a 26-yard field goal, while QB Jason Campbell completed an 8-yard TD pass to WR Antwaan Randle El.  In the fourth quarter, Seattle tried to come back as Hasselbeck completed a 10-yard TD pass to rookie TE John Carlson.  However, the Redskins retook with Suisham nailing a 22-yard field goal.  The Seahawks tried to get one final rally, but a Shawn Springs interception ended any hope of a comeback.

With the loss, Seattle fell to 2–9.

Week 13: at Dallas Cowboys

Trying to snap a four-game losing streak, the Seahawks flew to Texas Stadium for a Week 13 Thanksgiving duel with the Dallas Cowboys.  In the first quarter, Seattle trailed early as Cowboys QB Tony Romo completed a 16-yard TD pass to TE Martellus Bennett, along with RB Marion Barber getting a 2-yard TD run.  The Seahawks would respond with kicker Olindo Mare getting a 44-yard field goal.  In the second quarter, Dallas answered with Romo completing a 7-yard TD pass to TE Jason Witten, while Folk got a 41-yard field goal.  Seattle would close out the half with Mare making a 38-yard field goal.

In the third quarter, the Seahawks tried to rally as Mare made a 25-yard field goal.  The Cowboys replied with Romo completing a 19-yard TD pass to WR Terrell Owens.  In the fourth quarter, Dallas closed out the game with Folk nailing a 42-yard field goal.

With the loss, Seattle fell to 2–10.

This would prove to be the final game in the career of Seahawks legend Walter Jones.

Week 14: vs. New England Patriots

Week 15: at St. Louis Rams

The Rams played a solid 1st half but the Seahawks turned the tables with 10 points in the final 2:47 for a 23–20 victory Sunday. T. J. Duckett's 1-yard run tied it, the Rams fizzled while going three-and-out, and Olindo Mare's 27-yard field goal as time expired ended the Seahawks' six-game losing streak and extended the Rams' losing streak to 8.

Week 16: vs. New York Jets

After snapping a six-game losing streak the previous week, the Seahawks went home for a Week 16 interconference duel with the New York Jets, in what would be Mike Holmgren's last home game as the franchise's head coach.

Seattle would trail in the first quarter as Jets kicker Jay Feely got a 20-yard field goal.  The Seahawks would respond with quarterback Seneca Wallace completing a 2-yard touchdown pass to rookie tight end John Carlson.

In the second half, Seattle pulled away with kicker Olindo Mare's 31-yard field goal in the third quarter and a 38-yard field goal in the fourth quarter, while the defense would shut down New York's offense.

With the win, the Seahawks improved to 4–11.  This was the only time during the season that the Seahawks won back-to-back games as well as their only win over a team with a winning record.  This was also only the second ever Seahawks home game with snow falling.

Week 17: at Arizona Cardinals

Coming off their home win over the Jets, the Seahawks closed out the Mike Holmgren era at the University of Phoenix Stadium in a Week 17 NFC West rematch with the Arizona Cardinals.  Seattle would get the first quarter lead as running back T. J. Duckett got a 1-yard touchdown run.  The Cardinals would take the lead in the second quarter as quarterback Kurt Warner completed a 16-yard touchdown pass to wide receiver Jerheme Urban and a 5-yard touchdown pass to wide receiver Larry Fitzgerald.  The Seahawks tied the game prior to halftime as quarterback Seneca Wallace completed a 30-yard touchdown pass to wide receiver Deion Branch.

In the third quarter, Arizona retook the lead as Warner completed a 38-yard touchdown pass to Fitzgerald and a 14-yard touchdown pass to wide receiver Steve Breaston.  Seattle tried to come back in the fourth quarter as Wallace hooked up with Branch again on a 2-yard touchdown pass, but the Cardinals closed out the game with kicker Neil Rackers nailing a 23-yard and a 32-yard field goal.

With the loss, the Seahawks' season ended at 4–12.

References

Seattle
Seattle Seahawks seasons
Seattle Seahawks